Napa Junction (formerly, Adelante) is an unincorporated community in Napa County, California. It lies at an elevation of 79 feet (24 m).

The Adelante post office functioned from 1869 to 1871. The Napa Junction post office opened in 1875, was closed for a time in 1880, and closed permanently in 1933.

Part of Napa Junction has been annexed to and incorporated in American Canyon.

References

Unincorporated communities in Napa County, California
Unincorporated communities in California
Rail junctions in the United States